Preston Hopkins Smith (May 17, 1871 – December 16, 1945) was an American football player and coach. He was the second head football coach at Colgate University
and he held that position for the 1892 season. His coaching record at Colgate was 3–0.
The 1892 team was the first in Colgate history to go undefeated, with victories over Hamilton, Rochester, and St. John's Academy.  Some sources say that the 1892 team was coached by Samuel Colgate, Jr. and not Smith.

Smith attended Colgate and received a Bachelor of Philosophy degree in 1893. He played on the football team from 1890 to 1893, serving as captain in 1891 and 1892 (player-coach in the latter year). He lettered in the sport in 1890, 1891 and 1892.

Smith married Cordelia (Cora) Roberts in 1895. He later moved to Bayonne, New Jersey where he was a school principal. He died in 1945.

Head coaching record

References

1871 births
1945 deaths
19th-century players of American football
Colgate Raiders football coaches
Colgate Raiders football players
Player-coaches
Players of American football from New York (state)